Robert James Adams (28 February 1917 – 1 September 1970) was an English professional footballer who played in The Football League for Cardiff City, Bristol Rovers and Millwall.

Career

Born in Coleford, Gloucestershire, Adams joined Cardiff City at the age of 16 in 1932, keeping a clean sheet on his Football League debut soon after in February 1933 during a 2–0 win over Southend United in Division Three South. He spent two years at Ninian Park, largely as cover for Tom Farquharson, making eleven league appearances before leaving the club at the end of the 1933–34 season, joining Bristol Rovers.

He joined Millwall in 1935, making six league appearances, before finishing his professional career with Bristol City without breaking into the first team.

References

English footballers
Cardiff City F.C. players
Bristol City F.C. players
Millwall F.C. players
Bristol Rovers F.C. players
English Football League players
1917 births
1970 deaths
People from Coleford, Gloucestershire
People from Blakeney, Norfolk
Association football goalkeepers